Ennio B. Arboit (November 21, 1916 – September 11, 1954) was an American football and baseball player and coach. He played college football at the University of Notre Dame. He served as the head football coach at St. Ambrose University in Davenport, Iowa in 1946 before becoming the head coach at St. Anthony High School in Long Beach, California. He died in 1954.

Head coaching record

Football

References

External links

 

1916 births
1954 deaths
Notre Dame Fighting Irish football players
Norfolk Tars players
St. Ambrose Fighting Bees football coaches
High school football coaches in California